Bond Glacier is a steep, heavily crevassed glacier to the west of Ivanoff Head, flowing from the continental ice to Blunt Cove at the head of Vincennes Bay. It was mapped from air photos taken by U.S. Navy Operation Highjump (1946–47), and named by the Advisory Committee on Antarctic Names for Captain Charles A. Bond, U.S. Navy, commander of the expedition's Western Group.

See also
 List of glaciers in the Antarctic
 Glaciology

References
 

Glaciers of Wilkes Land